KF Liria Zhelinë (FK Lirija Želino) is a football club based in the village of Zhelinë near Tetovo, North Macedonia. They are currently competing in the OFS Tetovo league.

History
The club was founded in 1988.

References

External links
Liria Želino Facebook 
Club info at MacedonianFootball 
Football Federation of Macedonia 

Liria Želino
Association football clubs established in 1988
1988 establishments in the Socialist Republic of Macedonia
FK
Liria Zhelino